North Danville Historic District is a national historic district located at Danville, Virginia.  The district includes 426 contributing buildings in a primarily residential area of Danville. The district also includes three blocks of primarily two-story, brick commercial buildings. Buildings within the district were constructed from about 1880 to about 1955 and reflect a wide variety of architectural styles including vernacular Victorian, Italianate, Queen Ann, Colonial Revival, Tudor Revival, and Bungalow designs. Many of these buildings were built by Dan River Cotton Mills founder T.B. Fitzgerald. Notable buildings include the Calvary United Methodist Church (1886), Shelton Memorial Presbyterian Church (1889), Bellevue Public School (1898), Washington Street Methodist Episcopal Church (1910), Keen Street Baptist Church (1927), and Woodrow Wilson High School (1926).

It was listed on the National Register of Historic Places in 2004.

References

Historic districts on the National Register of Historic Places in Virginia
Buildings and structures in Danville, Virginia
National Register of Historic Places in Danville, Virginia